Isabella was launched in France in 1791 as the East Indiaman St Jean de Lone. Two British privateers captured her in 1793. She was sold in prize and renamed Isabella. She initially sailed as a West Indiaman and then between 1795 and 1798 made two voyages to India as an "extra" ship for the British East India Company (EIC). Afterwards, she returned to the West Indies and Baltic trades and was last listed in 1809, but with data stale since c.1802.

French East Indiaman
St.Jean de Lone was built in France in 1791.

Captain Marin Voisin was returning from Pondicherry, Yanaon, and Madras to Ostend or L'Orient in May 1793 with [Indian] bale goods, black pepper, sugar and dyewoods when on the 10th she encountered a British privateer from Liverpool. The privateer fired on St.Jean de Lone, alerting her to the fact that war with Britain had broken out. The French were able to repel the privateer, which sailed off.

St.Jean de Lone was armed with 12 guns and had a crew of 41 men. The cutter Surprize, which was armed with 10 guns, was the first to encounter St.Jean de Lone and the two maintained a running engagement for two and a half hours before the lugger Resolution arrived on the scene. She joined the engagement, which continued for another five hours before St. Jean de Lone struck, some three hours out of Lorient and safety. She had lost one man killed and four wounded. Surprize had one man killed and six wounded, and Resolution had four men wounded. Surprize brought St. Jean de Lone into Plymouth, while Resolution returned to Guernsey to refit. St Jean de Lone and her cargo were valued at £150,000.

British merchantman
St.Jean de Lone was condemned in prize on 26 July 1793. Wilkinson & Co., London, purchased and renamed her Isabella.

Isabella first appeared in Lloyd's Register (LR) in 1794.

In 1795 G.Wilkinson chartered Isabella to the EIC. Before she sailed Perry, Blackwall, measured her.

1st EIC voyage (1795–1796): Captain George Wilkinson acquired a letter of marque on 11 June 1795. He sailed from Gravesend on 14 June, from Deal on 15 June, and from the Downs on 6 July, bound for Bengal. Isabella arrived at Balasore on 30 November. Homeward bound, she was at Calcutta on 18 January 1796 and at the Cape on 19 April. She reached St Helena on 5 May and arrived back in the Downs on 3 August.

2nd EIC voyage (1796–1798): Captain Wilkinson sailed from Portsmouth on 18 October 1793, bound for Madras, Bombay, and Bengal. Isabella reached Madras on 12 February 1797. She then was at Colombo on 28 February and arrived at Bombay on 28 March. She returned to Madras on 11 May and arrived at Calcutta on 1 July. Homeward bound, she was at Saugor on 26 November and the Cape on 18 February 1798. She reached St Helena on 21 March and Cork on 25 June, and arrived at the Downs on 8 July.

On her return, Isabella resumed the West Indies trade, but with a new master and owner. 

A key source states that in 1799 Isabella was lost at sea. However, on 22 September 1800, Captain George Brown acquired a letter of marque. Isabella, Brown, master, arrived back at Gravesend on 2 July 1799 from Grenada.

Although there are records of Isabella with Brown or Dunbar as master sailing to Danzig, Drontheim, Martinique, and Madeira during the 1801–1802 period, she does not appear in LL in the 1803–1804 period.

Notes, citations, and references
Notes

Citations

References
 
 

1791 ships
Ships built in France
Captured ships
Age of Sail merchant ships of England
Ships of the British East India Company